Natalya Kayukova (born 10 December 1966) is a retired Russian triple jumper. Her personal best jump was 14.51 metres, achieved in May 1999 in Vladivostok.

She finished fourth at the 1996 European Athletics Indoor Championships and twelfth at the 1997 IAAF World Indoor Championships. She also competed at the 1996 Olympic Games without reaching the final.

International competitions

References

1966 births
Living people
Russian female long jumpers
Russian female triple jumpers
Olympic female triple jumpers
Olympic athletes of Russia
Athletes (track and field) at the 1996 Summer Olympics
World Athletics Championships athletes for Russia
Russian Athletics Championships winners